Viktor Tobias Johansson (born 14 September 1998) is a Swedish professional footballer who plays as a goalkeeper for English club Rotherham United. A product of the Hammarby and Aston Villa academies, he has represented Sweden up to under-21 level. Johansson spent two years at Premier League side Leicester City but only appeared in EFL Trophy matches for their U21 side.

Club career
Johansson spent his early career with Stuvsta, Hammarby, Aston Villa, Alfreton Town and Leicester City.

In September 2020 he signed for Rotherham United. He made his first appearance in a 2–1 win at home against Preston North End on 7 November 2020.

International career
Johansson has represented Sweden at under-17, under-19 and under-21 youth levels.

In March 2023, he received his first call-up to the Swedish senior national team for the UEFA Euro 2024 qualifying matches against Belgium and Azerbaijan.

Career statistics

Honours
Rotherham United
League One runner-up: 2021–22
EFL Trophy: 2021–22
Individual

 Rotherham United Young Player of the Season: 2020–21

References

1998 births
Living people
Swedish footballers
Association football goalkeepers
Hammarby Fotboll players
Aston Villa F.C. players
Alfreton Town F.C. players
Leicester City F.C. players
Rotherham United F.C. players
National League (English football) players
English Football League players
Swedish expatriate footballers
Expatriate footballers in England
Swedish expatriate sportspeople in England
Sweden youth international footballers
Sweden under-21 international footballers